Science & Nature is the third album by The Bluetones. It was released on 15 May 2000 on Universal Records. Its offspring singles were "Keep the Home Fires Burning" and "Autophilia". "Mudslide" was released as an EP.

Music
According to Iain Forrester of Stylus Magazine, Science & Nature "abandons the sound they stuck to rigidly elsewhere," and "while being successfully aware of their limitations throws everything they can think of (country, jazz, folk, prog) at melodic pop." He called it "inventive and gently surprising." Jason Damas of AllMusic felt that the album was largely not as new wave-influenced as many suggested prior to release, except on "Mudslide", but did find the album to contain "a bit more of a pop leaning." Drowned in Sound's Thomas Blatchford said the record contained "invention and refined sensibility."

Track listing
All tracks written by: Chesters, Devlin, Morriss, Morriss, Payne
  "Zorrro" – 3:39
  "The Last of the Great Navigators" – 3:48
  "Tiger Lily" – 3:25
  "Mudslide" – 4:21
  "One Speed Gearbox" – 3:46
  "Blood Bubble" – 3:33
  "Autophilia (or How I Learned to Stop Worrying and Love My Car)" – 4:59
  "Keep the Home Fires Burning" – 3:27
  "The Basement Song" – 5:14
  "Slack Jaw" – 2:59
  "Emily's Pine" – 6:03
  "It's a Boy" (Japanese Bonus Track) – 1:34

References

2000 albums
The Bluetones albums
Albums produced by John Cornfield